Fattegad is a fort located 15 km from Dapoli, in the Ratnagiri district of Maharashtra. It is one of three forts built to guard the Suvarnadurg fort; the other two are Goa fort and Kanakdurg.

History 
The fort was built by Khairiyat Khan during the Shivaji era. This fort was under the control of Tulaji Angre. Due to the rivalry between Peshwa and Tulaji Angre, a combined efforts were made by British and the Peshwa against Tulaji. The fort was captured by Captain James and handed over to Peshwas.  In 1817 British forces captured the fort from the Peshwas.

Nearby places 
The nearest town is Dapoli. The fort is at walkable distance from the Harne town. A wide motorable road leads to the entrance gate of the fort. It takes about half an hour to have a walk around the fort.

Appearance 
The fort is in a dilapidated state. The only parts of the fort left standing are the walls and the bridge joining with Kanakdurg.

See also 
 List of forts in Maharashtra
 List of forts in India
 Kanhoji Angre
 Marathi People
 Maratha Navy
 List of Maratha dynasties and states
 Maratha War of Independence
 Battles involving the Maratha Empire
 Military history of India
 List of people involved in the Maratha Empire

References 

Buildings and structures of the Maratha Empire
Forts in Ratnagiri district
16th-century forts in India
Caves of Maharashtra
Tourist attractions in Konkan
Former populated places in India